Front running, also known as tailgating, is the prohibited practice of entering into an equity (stock) trade, option, futures contract, derivative, or security-based swap to capitalize on advance, nonpublic knowledge of a large ("block") pending transaction that will influence the price of the underlying security. In essence, it means the practice of engaging in a personal or proprietary securities transaction in advance of a transaction in the same security for a client's account.  Front running is considered a form of market manipulation in many markets. Cases typically involve individual brokers or brokerage firms trading stock in and out of undisclosed, unmonitored accounts of relatives or confederates. Institutional and individual investors may also commit a front running violation when they are privy to inside information.  A front running firm either buys for its own account before filling customer buy orders that drive up the price, or sells for its own account before filling customer sell orders that drive down the price. Front running is prohibited since the front-runner profits come from nonpublic information, at the expense of its own customers, the block trade, or the public market.

In 2003, several hedge fund and mutual fund companies became embroiled in an illegal late trading scandal made public by a complaint against Bank of America brought by New York Attorney General Eliot Spitzer. A resulting U.S. Securities and Exchange Commission investigation into allegations of front-running activity implicated Edward D. Jones & Co., Inc., Goldman Sachs, Morgan Stanley, Strong Mutual Funds, Putnam Investments, Invesco, and Prudential Securities.

Following interviews in 2012 and 2013, the FBI said front running had resulted in profits of $50 million to $100 million for the bank.
Wall Street traders may have manipulated a key derivatives market by front running Fannie Mae and Freddie Mac.

The terms originate from the era when stock market trades were executed via paper carried by hand between trading desks. The routine business of hand-carrying client orders between desks would normally proceed at a walking pace, but a broker could literally run in front of the walking traffic to reach the desk and execute his own personal account order immediately before a large client order.  Likewise, a broker could tail behind the person carrying a large client order to be the first to execute immediately after.  Such actions amount to a type of insider trading, since they involve non-public knowledge of upcoming trades, and the broker privately exploits this information by controlling the sequence of those trades to favor a personal position.

Explanation
For example, suppose a broker receives a market order from a customer to buy a large block—say, 400,000 shares—of some stock, but before placing the order for the customer, the broker buys 20,000 shares of the same stock for their own account at $100 per share, then afterward places the customer's order for 400,000 shares, driving the price up to $102 per share and allowing the broker to immediately sell their shares for, say, $101.75, generating a significant profit of $35,000 in just a short time. This $35,000 is likely to be just a part of the additional cost to the customer's purchase caused by the broker's self-dealing.

This example uses unusually large numbers to get the point across. In practice, computer trading splits up large orders into many smaller ones, making front-running more difficult to detect. Moreover, the U.S. Securities and Exchange Commission's 2001 change to pricing stock in pennies, rather than fractions of no less than 1/8 of a dollar, facilitated front running by reducing the extra amount that must be offered to step in front of other orders.

By front-running, the broker has put his or her own financial interest above the customer's interest and is thus committing fraud. In the United States, they might also be breaking laws on market manipulation or insider trading.

Other uses of the term
Front-running may also occur in the context of insider trading, as when those close to the CEO of a firm act through short sales ahead of the announcement of a sale of stock by the CEO, which will in turn trigger a drop in the stock's price. Khan & Lu (2008: 1) define front running as "trading by some parties in advance of large trades by other parties, in anticipation of profiting from the price movement that follows the large trade". They find evidence consistent with front-running through short sales ahead of large stock sales by CEOs on the New York Stock Exchange.

While front-running is illegal when a broker uses private information about a client's pending order, in principle it is not illegal if it is based on public information. In his book Trading & Exchanges, Larry Harris outlines several other related types of trading. Though all these types of trading may not be strictly illegal, he terms them "parasitic".

A third-party trader may find out the content of another broker's order and buy or sell in front of it in the same way that a self-dealing broker might. The third-party trader might find out about the trade directly from the broker or an employee of the brokerage firm in return for splitting the profits, in which case the front-running would be illegal.  The trader might, however, only find out about the order by reading the broker's habits or tics, much in the same way that poker players can guess other players' cards.  For very large market orders, simply exposing the order to the market, may cause traders to front-run as they seek to close out positions that may soon become unprofitable.

Large limit orders can be "front-run" by "order matching" or "penny jumping".  For example, if a buy limit order for 100,000 shares for $1.00 is announced to the market, many traders may seek to buy for $1.01.  If the market price increases after their purchases, they will get the full amount of the price increase.  However, if the market price decreases, they will likely be able to sell to the limit order trader, for only a one cent loss.  This type of trading is probably not illegal, and in any case, a law against it would be very difficult to enforce.

Other types of traders who use generally similar strategies are labelled "order anticipators."  These include "sentiment-oriented technical traders", traders who buy during an asset bubble even though they know the asset is overpriced, and squeezers who drive up prices by threatening to corner the market.  Squeezers would likely be guilty of market manipulation, but the other two types of order anticipators would not be violating any US law.

"Front running" is sometimes used informally for a broker's tactics related to trading on proprietary information before its clients have been given the information.

In insurance sales, front running is a practice in which agents "leak" information (usually false) to consumers about a competitor insurance company that leads the consumer to believe that the company's products or services are inferior, or worthless. The agent subsequently obtains a sale at the consumer's expense, earns a commission, and the consumer may have given up a perfectly good product for an inferior one as the result of the subterfuge.

For example, analysts and brokers who buy shares in a company just before the brokerage firm is about to recommend the stock as a strong buy, are practising this type of "front running".  Brokers have been convicted of securities laws violations in the United States for such behavior. In 1985, a writer for the Wall Street Journal, R. Foster Winans, tipped off brokers about the content of his column Heard on the Street, which based upon publicly available information would be written in such a way as to give either good or bad news about various stocks.  The tipped off brokers traded on the information. Winans and the brokers were prosecuted by the prosecutor Rudolph Giuliani, tried and convicted of securities fraud.  Their convictions were upheld by the United States Supreme Court in 1986.

Recent cases 
In July 2020 Ken Griffin's Citadel Securities was fined $700,000 for trading ahead of its clients from 2012-2014.

See also
 Domain name front running
 Principal–agent problem (An economic theory applicable to front running, where stock brokers are agents, and brokerage clients are principals)

Notes

References

External links
 
 
 
 

Securities (finance)
Financial crimes